The Office of Knowledge Management and Development (Public Organization) is an autonomous public organization in Thailand reporting to the Office of the Prime Minister. It was established in 2004, and is tasked with promoting continuous learning and supporting the creativity industry. Among its constituent organizations are TK Park, the National Discovery Museum Institute and, until 2018, the Thailand Creative & Design Center.

References

Public organizations of Thailand
Educational organizations based in Thailand